The Rivers and Fisheries Trusts of Scotland (RAFTS) (also known as the Association of Scottish River & Fishery Management Trusts) is a waterway society, an unincorporated association, a Scottish charity, and an umbrella organisation for river trusts in Scotland, based in Edinburgh.

RAFTS is the representative of all of Scotland's river systems. It develops Codes of Conduct and educational opportunities.

The work of RAFTS includes research, monitoring, conservation, education, training, practical restoration work, and provision of advice to fishery and riparian owners.

RAFTS works with schools, local authorities, biodiversity action groups, public bodies, government bodies, businesses, private individuals, fishery owners, anglers and district salmon fishery boards.

List of members:
 Atlantic Salmon Trust
 Argyll Fisheries Trust
 Association of Salmon Fishery Boards
 Galloway Fisheries Trust 
 Loch Lomond Fisheries Trust

See also
List of rivers in Scotland
List of waterway societies in the United Kingdom
Association of Rivers Trusts (ART) - English/Welsh equivalent to RAFTS

External links
Rivers and Fisheries Trusts of Scotland
The Scottish Government: A Strategic Framework for Scottish Freshwater Fisheries / Members of the Freshwater Fisheries Forum Steering Group
European Union Interreg: Atlantic Salmon Arc Project 2: Lead Partner is a member of RAFTS
The Herald newspaper, 7 March 2008: Fisheries Trusts get £400,000 from Scottish Government to improve rivers
Invasive Non-native Species in Scotland: A Prevention Programme to Protect Our Natural Biodiversity
Galloway Fisheries Trust

Rivers of Scotland
Waterways organisations in Scotland
Charities based in Edinburgh
Fishing in Scotland
Science and technology in Scotland
Nature conservation organisations based in the United Kingdom